Wert may refer to:

People
 Don Wert (born 1938), American former third baseman in Major League Baseball
 Giaches de Wert, Flemish composer of the Renaissance, active in Italy
 J. Howard Wert (19th century), American author and collector
 Jeffry D. Wert (21st century), American historian and author
 José Ignacio Wert (21st century), Spanish sociologist and politician, former Minister of Education.
 Ray Wert (21st century), American online publication editor

Other uses
 Wertpapierkennnummer, is a German securities identification code
 WERT, a commercial AM radio station in Van Wert, Ohio, U.S.
 wert, a past subjunctive form of to be formerly used with the pronoun thou

See also
 De Wert (disambiguation)
 Van Wert (disambiguation)